Wangyue Subdistrict is an urban subdistrict and the seat of Yuelu District in Changsha, Hunan Province, China. The subdistrict is located in the north eastern part of the district, it is bordered to the north by Yueliangdao Subdistrict of Wangcheng District, to the east by Guanshaling Subdistrict, to the south by Meixihu, Lugu and Yinpenling Subdistricts, to the west by Wangchengpo Subdistrict.

History
The subdistrict of Wangyue is historically Wangyue Township. The township of Wangyue was a township of Changsha County in 1950, it was a township of Wangcheng County formed in 1951. The county of Wancgeng was merged to Changsha County in 1957, it was a part of Changsha County. The Suburb District was dissolved in 1996 and it became a part of Yuelu District formed in the same year. The township of Wangyue was reorganized to a subdistrict in 2001.

Subdivision
The subdistrict of Wangyue has four communities and three villages under its jurisdiction.

4 communities
 Fuhoulu Community
 Henghua Community
 Bafang Community
 Qiliying Community

3 villages
 Gufeng Village
 Gushan Village
 Outang Village

External links
 Official Website （Chinese / 中文）

References

Subdistricts of Changsha
Yuelu District